Oxland is located in Alexandria, Louisiana.  It was added to the National Register of Historic Places on December 5, 1984, and was delisted in 2016.

References

Catepory:Former National Register of Historic Places in Louisiana

Houses on the National Register of Historic Places in Louisiana
Federal architecture in Louisiana
Houses completed in 1825
Houses in Alexandria, Louisiana
National Register of Historic Places in Rapides Parish, Louisiana
1825 establishments in Louisiana